The 2012 Idol Star Athletics – Swimming Championships (Hangul: 아이돌 스타 육상-수영 선수권 대회) was held at Jamsil Arena in Seoul, South Korea on January 8, 2012 and was broadcast on MBC on January 24, 2012 (2 episodes). At the championships a total number of 10 events in athletics and 2 events in swimming were contested: 6 by men and 6 by women. There were a total number of 150 participating K-pop singers and celebrities, divided into 16 teams.

Results

Men

Athletics

Swimming
Special appearance and swimming performance by Choi Kyu-woong.

Women

Athletics

Swimming

Ratings

References

External links
2012 Idol Star Athletics-Swimming Championships official MBC website 

MBC TV original programming
South Korean variety television shows
South Korean game shows
2012 in South Korean television
Idol Star Athletics Championships